Sugarloaf Island may refer to:

 Sugarloaf Island (Alaska), one of the Barren Islands
 Sugar Loaf Island (California)
 Sugarloaf Island (South Shetland Islands)
 Mota Island, northern Vanuatu
 one of the Farallon Islands